Tydemania navigatoris, the Fleshy-lipped spikefish, is a species of spikefish native to the Indian and Pacific Oceans where it occurs at depths of from .  This species grows to a length of  SL.  This fish is specialized to feed on the scales of other fishes.  This species is the only known member of its genus.

References

Tetraodontiformes
Taxa named by Max Carl Wilhelm Weber
Fish described in 1913